Huangling （黄陵， "Yellow Tomb" or 皇陵 "Emperor's Tomb"） is the name of several places in China. It may refer to:

 Huangling County, in Shaanxi
 Huangling, Linquan County, a town in Anhui
 Huangling, Dianbai County, a town in Guangdong
 Huangling, Fengqiu County (:zh:黄陵镇), a town in Fengqiu County, Henan
 Huangling Mausoleum (:zh:明皇陵) of the parents of the Hongwu Emperor, in Fengyang County, Anhui